Sergey Anatolyevich Kulinich (born 17 May 1960) is a Russian professional association football coach and a former player. Currently, he is an assistant manager with FC Ural Sverdlovsk Oblast.

As a player, he made an appearance in the 1984–85 European Cup quarterfinal game for FC Dnipro Dnipropetrovsk against Bordeaux. He played three seasons in the Soviet Top League for Dnipro and FC Kairat.

Honours
Soviet Top League bronze: 1985

External links
Career summary by KLISF

1960 births
Living people
Soviet footballers
FC Dnipro players
FC Kairat players
FC Metalurh Zaporizhzhia players
FC Shakhter Karagandy players
Soviet Top League players
Russian footballers
Russian expatriate footballers
Expatriate footballers in Hungary
Russian football managers
Association football defenders
FC Novokuznetsk players